Gilberto Adul Seidi (born 20 November 1992) is a Guinea-Bissauan professional footballer who plays for Fabril Barreiro, as a centre forward. In 2014, he made two appearances for the Guinea-Bissau national team.

Club career
Born in Bissau, Seidi spent his early career with Lusitano, Alcobendas Sport, Serzedelo, Fafe, Vianense, União de Leiria, ASIL Lysi, Gondomar and Benfica e Castelo Branco.

On 11 January 2017, Seidi signed for Marítimo until July 2020. He played for their B team, and also spent time on loan at Sporting Covilhã.

In August 2018, he joined Créteil. In January 2019 he moved to União da Madeira for 6 months.

International career
He made his senior international debut for Guinea-Bissau in 2014.

References

1992 births
Living people
Association football forwards
Bissau-Guinean footballers
Guinea-Bissau international footballers
Lusitano F.C. (Portugal) players
CD Paracuellos Antamira players
G.D. Serzedelo players
AD Fafe players
SC Vianense players
U.D. Leiria players
ASIL Lysi players
Gondomar S.C. players
Sport Benfica e Castelo Branco players
C.S. Marítimo players
S.C. Covilhã players
US Créteil-Lusitanos players
C.F. União players
S.U. Sintrense players
G.D. Fabril players
A.C. Marinhense players
SC São João de Ver players
Campeonato de Portugal (league) players
Liga Portugal 2 players
Cypriot Second Division players
Bissau-Guinean expatriate footballers
Bissau-Guinean expatriate sportspeople in Portugal
Expatriate footballers in Portugal
Bissau-Guinean expatriate sportspeople in Spain
Expatriate footballers in Spain
Bissau-Guinean expatriate sportspeople in Cyprus
Expatriate footballers in Cyprus
Bissau-Guinean expatriate sportspeople in France
Expatriate footballers in France